The 1918 All-Ireland Senior Football Championship was the 32nd staging of Ireland's premier Gaelic football knock-out competition. Wexford won a record fourth title in a row, an achievement which had never been completed.

Results

Connacht Senior Football Championship

Leinster Senior Football Championship

Munster Senior Football Championship

Ulster Senior Football Championship

All-Ireland Senior Football Championship
By the time the semi-final was to be played, the Leinster championship was not finished, so Louth were nominated to represent Leinster. When Wexford beat Louth in the Leinster final, they were given Louth's place in the All-Ireland final.

Championship statistics

Miscellaneous

 Due to Spanish flu most games were delayed.
 Wexford become the first county to win the Leinster football title for the sixth year in a row and the  All Ireland football title for the fourth year in a row.

References

All-Ireland Senior Football Championship